The Alpina B3 (E90)  and Alpina D3 (E90) are a series of high performance compact executive cars manufactured by German automobile manufacturer Alpina from 2007 to 2013. Based on the BMW 3 Series (E90), the B3 and D3 were available in coupé, saloon, convertible (not available for the D3) and station wagon body styles. The B3 was officially unveiled at the 2007 Geneva Motor Show.

Development and introduction 
Development of the B3 began in 2006. At that time, it was speculated that the car would either be introduced with a 4.4-litre supercharged V8 engine (already used in the B5, B6 and B7) or a naturally aspirated V8 engine (as used in the 550i and 750i). The supercharger would've been Alpina's own design. Both of these speculations were nullified when the car was introduced in 2007 as it utilised a modified version of the BMW N54 inline-6 engine used in the 335i. The B3 was available with rear-wheel-drive or all-wheel-drive drivetrains. The cars equipped with the all-wheel-drive (BMW xDrive) system were called Allrad.

The engine was modified by the addition of an Alpina specific ECU, oil cooler and lighter and stronger MAHLE pistons. The engine has a red-line of 7,000 rpm. The engine was mated to a 6-speed ZF automatic transmission paired with a control system called Switch Tronic. The control system was first introduced by the company in 1993 and has a manual mode which allows the driver to change gears either by the gear lever or by buttons present behind the steering wheel. Shift times had been significantly improved, taking 100 milliseconds to shift gears.

The company re-introduced one of their signature exterior colours for the B3 namely Alpina Green as Alpina Green II. However, the car could be ordered in any colour out of the standard exterior colours as offered on its predecessor. The exterior changes included optional Alpina pinstripes, a front spoiler with Alpina lettering, the choice of three alloy wheels; 19-inch classic wheels, 20-inch multi-spoke wheels and 19-inch traditional wheels (set of 4-spokes in a 5-spoke design), a rear lip spoiler and a light weight Akrapovic stainless steel exhaust system with quad exhaust tips. The exhaust system had a floating tip design, a first to be used on an Alpina vehicle.

The interior could be customised to the customer specifications by the Alpina interior department.

The suspension system of the B3 utilised a mixture of in-house developed components and BMW components. The coupé and cabriolet version used the shocks from the 335i Sport while the Saloon and Wagon variants used the shocks as found on the standard 335i. The coil springs as found on the 335i Sport are used throughout the B3 versions. The rear subframe bushings are the same as those found on the 335d while the secondary springs used are a mixture of those found on the 335xd and 335i Sport. The front stabilisers are the same as used on the 335i Sport while the rear stabilisers are bespoke units which are smaller than those found on the 335i. The use of different stabilisers allow for a better turn in and safe cornering. The suspension geometry is shared with the D3.

The tyres used on the B3 are Michelin Pilot Sport tyres measuring 245/35 ZR18 at the front and 265/30 ZR18 at the rear. The tyres use the same aspect ratio as on the B7.

Performance 

Tested performance figures are as follows:
 : 2.39 seconds
 : 3.30 seconds
 : 4.15 seconds
 : 5.17 seconds
 : 6.51 seconds
 : 7.96 seconds
 : 9.57 seconds
 : 11.57 seconds

Variants

D3 

The D3 is the diesel powered variant of the B3. It is based on the 320d but utilises a modified version of the N47 inline-4 diesel engine as found on the 123d. The reason to use this engine was to have high performance while maintaining a good fuel economy. The engine received the same modifications as on the B3 with the only difference being the cat back exhaust system having dual exhaust tips instead of quad.

The D3 is claimed to be more fuel efficient than its 3 Series diesel counterparts (those being the 325d and 335d). The D3 has BMW efficient dynamics system, a start/stop system, a decoupling alternator and active aerodynamics as standard. Unlike the B3, the D3 was not offered in the convertible body style.

The use of the inline-4 engine allows the car to be lighter than the donor car, the difference being  in terms of weight. It also allows the car to have better handling than its counterparts also made possible due to non-run flat tyres.

B3 S 
The B3 S is a high performance variant of the B3. Introduced at the 2010 Geneva Motor Show, the B3 S had a redesigned front spoiler, 19-inch wheels from the B7 and a new rear diffuser. The engine had a compression ratio of 9.4:1 and a peak boost pressure of 1.2 bar. The B3 S had wider tyres than the B3, those measuring 245/40 ZR18 at the front and 265/40 ZR18 at the rear. The interior options remained the same as on the standard B3.

B3 GT3 

The B3 GT3 is a high performance variant of the B3 S. Available only in the coupé bodystyle, the GT3 commemorates Alpina's return to motorsport and celebrates their victory in the 2011 ADAC GT Masters with an Alpina B6 GT3. The GT3 has a track-oriented coil over suspension system having 12 settings of damper compression and 18 settings of damper rebound along with a lowered ride height.

The brakes have rotors measuring  front and aft with six-piston callipers. The car has a Drexler mechanical limited slip differential as standard. The exterior changes included a new front spoiler, front canards, a larger rear diffuser and a fixed rear wing.

The GT3 had a limited production run of 99 units.

Gallery

References

External links 

B3
Cars introduced in 2007
Cars introduced in 2010
Rear-wheel-drive vehicles
Sports sedans
Wagons
Compact executive cars
Coupés
Convertibles